The Spa of Embarrassing Illnesses is a ten-part television series presented and co-produced by nutritionist Amanda Hamilton on UK Style TV related to Embarrassing Bodies. The show revolves around a group of eight people trying to conquer their embarrassing and intimate health conditions through alternative medicine as well as psychological counseling. Three series have aired, with filming in Andalusia, Turkey, and the French Alps.

British reality television series